The Australian Academy of Law (AAL) is a permanent, non-government organisation devoted to the advancement of the discipline of law. According to its Constitution, the Australian Academy of Law comprises individuals of exceptional distinction from all parts of the legal community, including academia, the practising profession (including private and public sector lawyers), and the judiciary.

The Academy is registered under the Australian Charities and Not-for-profits Commission Act 2012 (Cth). The Academy is a Deductible Gift Recipient, specifically listed in Division 30 of the Income Tax Assessment Act 1997 (Cth).

The Academy was established on 17 July 2007, following recommendations made in the Australian Law Reform Commission's report, Managing Justice: A Review of the Federal Civil Justice System.

Patrons 
The Foundation Patron of the Academy was Chief Justice Murray Gleeson AC, Chief Justice of Australia.

The second Patron of the Academy was Chief Justice Robert French AC, Chief Justice of Australia.

The present Patron of the Academy is The Hon Chief Justice Susan Kiefel AC, Chief Justice of Australia.

Presidents 
The first President of the Academy, from 2008, was the Hon Robert Nicholson AO KCSJ.
 
From 2011 to 2020 the President was the Hon Kevin Lindgren AM QC.
 
The current President is the Hon Alan Robertson SC (with effect from 1 July 2020).

Foundation Fellows 
When the Academy was founded in 2007 there were 36 Foundation Fellows, who were, in alphabetical order:

 Professor David Barker
 Professor Larissa Behrendt
 Her Excellency Ms Quentin Bryce AC
 Mr Henry Burmester AO QC
 Professor Donald RC Chalmers
 Professor Hilary Charlesworth
 Justice Terry Connolly
 Professor Michael Coper
 Professor Rosalind Croucher
 Associate Professor Andrea Durbach
 Professor Paul Fairall
 Mr Glenn Ferguson
 Justice Robert French
 Judge John Goldring
 Justice Susan Kenny
 Justice Susan Kiefel
 Justice Kevin Lindgren
 Justice Margaret McMurdo
 Professor Marcia Neave AO
 Justice Robert Nicholson AO
 Dr Melissa Perry QC
 Justice Ronald Sackville
 Professor Cheryl Saunders AO
 Justice Ralph Simmonds
 Justice Stephen Southwood
 Justice Margaret Stone
 Ms Pamela M Tate SC
 Professor Margaret Thornton
 Ms Anne Trimmer
 The Hon John von Doussa
 Mr Bret Walker SC
 Emeritus Professor Louis Waller AO
 Professor Kate Warner
 Justice Mark Weinberg
 Emeritus Professor David Weisbrot
 Justice Margaret White

Fellows 
The Academy consists of an elected Fellowship which includes nine Life Fellows, 342 Fellows and 16 Overseas Fellows as at January 2021.

The Life Fellows, in alphabetical order, are:
 Emeritus Professor David Barker AM
 The Hon Dame Quentin Bryce AC, CVO
 The Hon Robert French AC
 The Hon Murray Gleeson AC, GBS
 The Hon Chief Justice Susan Kiefel AC
 The Hon Kevin Lindgren AM, KC
 The Hon Sir Anthony Mason AC, KBE, CBE, GBM
 The Hon Robert Nicholson AO, KCSJ
 Emeritus Professor David Weisbrot AM

Directors 
The current Directors are:

 The Hon Alan Robertson SC
 The Hon Justice Anthony Besanko
 Emeritus Professor Bee Chen Goh
 Emeritus Professor David Barker AM
 The Hon Kevin Lindgren AM, KC
 The Hon G John Digby KC
 The Hon Emeritus Professor Ralph Simmonds
 Professor Les McCrimmon
 Professor Gino Dal Pont
 Mr Russell Miller AM
 Dr Nuncio D'Angelo
 Mr Michael Murray
 The Hon Pamela Tate AM, KC
 Professor Natalie Skead
 Associate Professor Philip Chung

Officeholders 
The Academy's current officeholders  are:

President: The Hon Alan Robertson SC

Deputy President: The Hon Anthony Besanko

Treasurer: Emeritus Professor Bee Chen Goh

Secretary: Emeritus Professor David Barker AM

Committees 
The Academy has the following Board Committees:

The Prizes and Scholarships Committee

The Research and Expenditure Committee

The Events Committees

The Website and Communications Committee

The Governance Committee

The Membership Committee

The Finance Committee.

There is also an Event Organising Committee in each State and Territory.

Prizes and scholarships 
The Australian Academy of Law awards an annual essay prize of AU$10,000. It was inaugurated in 2015.

In 2022, the essay topic is “What are one or more reforms that could be made to remedy deficiencies in the administration by Australian courts of the criminal law as it applies to minorities or disadvantaged groups? 
Note: The essay should not focus on funding by government.”

The 2022 prize winners were Catherine Bugler (QUT) and Alice Muir (UQ) who both worked as Associates to Judges of the Supreme Court of Queensland.

The title of their essay was Recommendations to Alleviate Gendered, Racial and Socio-Economic Inequalities in the Administration of the Bail System. 

The judging panel was former High Court Justice, Professor William Gummow AC, Emeritus Professor Kate 
Warner AC and Mr Tim Game SC.

The rules governing the Annual Essay Prize 2022 are on the AAL's website.

The winning essay will be published in the Australian Law Journal.

Prize winners from 2015 to 2021 are listed on the Academy's website.

As well, the Academy awards annually the Michael Coper Memorial Prize of $1,500 to the winner of the Paper Presentation Competition conducted by the Australian Law Students' Association, and a prize of $1,500 for the best presentation at the Australian and New Zealand Law Honours Conference.

In 2021, the AAL offered for the first time the Australian Academy of Law First Nations Scholarship tenable in 2021 for a First Nations final year law student. The amount of the award was $5,000. Applications were through nominations by the respective Law Deans. The selection criteria are on the AAL's website. The First Nations Scholar for 2021 was Ms Mikeyli Hendry, a student at the University of Adelaide.
The First Nations Scholar for 2022 was Ms Lillian Ireland, a student at the Australian National University.

References

External links 

 

Learned societies of Australia
Australian National Academies
Fellows of the Australian Academy of Law
2007 establishments in Australia